Francisco Reiguera (November 9, 1899 – March 15, 1969) was a Spanish actor who is best known for playing the title role in Orson Welles’ unfinished film version of Don Quixote. He also appeared in the films Simon of the Desert (1965), Major Dundee (1965) and Guns for San Sebastian (1968).

Selected filmography
 The Noiseless Dead (1946)
 Adventure in the Night (1948)
 Nocturne of Love (1948)
 The Genius (1948)
 Tender Pumpkins (1949)
 Confessions of a Taxi Driver (1949)
 The Brave Bulls (1951)
 Kill Me Because I'm Dying! (1951)
 Engagement Ring (1951)
 Snow White (1952)
 You've Got Me By the Wing (1953)
 Juan Polainas (1960)
 Three Black Angels (1960)
 Chucho el Roto (1960)
 Juan Polainas (1960)
 Guns for San Sebastian (1968)
 Shark! (1969; posthumous release)

References

External links

1899 births
1969 deaths
Spanish male film actors
20th-century Spanish male actors